is an autobahn in western Germany. From the junction with the A 1 it connects to the A 3 and A 61 near Koblenz and is fully part of European route E 44.

Exit list 

 
 

 

 

 
 

 

 
 
|}

External links 

48
A048